This article constitutes a list of massacres occurring in the city of Jerusalem.

List

References

See also 

 Ben Yehuda Street bombings
 List of massacres in Israel

List of massacres in Jerusalem
Jerusalem
Massacres in Israel
Massacres in the Palestinian territories
Massacres
Crime in Jerusalem
Murder in Jerusalem